"Sunday Sunrise" is a song written by Mark James and recorded by Brenda Lee and Anne Murray.  Lee's version was a Top Ten U.S. and Canadian Country hit in 1973. Murray's rendition reached #13 on both the Canadian Adult Contemporary chart and the U.S. Adult Contemporary chart in 1975.  The song appeared on Murray's 1975 album, Together and was produced by Tom Catalano.

The song is about the new hope that the dawning of the day brings.

Brenda Lee version
Brenda Lee released a version in 1973 that reached No. 6 on the Hot Country Songs chart in October 1973. For Lee, it was the second single release of a song written by Mark James, the first being "Always On My Mind." With the song's top 10 placement on the chart, it marked back-to-back top 10 hits for Lee, the teen-aged pop star from the 1960s who had in the meantime developed a strong following among country fans; her previous single, the Kris Kristofferson-penned "Nobody Wins," reached No. 5 in May 1973.

Chart performance

Brenda Lee

Anne Murray

References

1973 singles
1975 singles
Songs written by Mark James (songwriter)
Anne Murray songs
Brenda Lee songs
Capitol Records singles
MCA Nashville Records singles
1973 songs
Song recordings produced by Tom Catalano